Two ships of the United States Navy have been named USS Chenango, after the Chenango River of New York.

 , was  a side-wheel steamer in service during the American Civil War in 1864 and 1865.
 , was a fleet oiler commissioned in 1941, converted to an escort aircraft carrier in 1942, and in service until 1946.

Sources

United States Navy ship names